Poręby may refer to the following places in Poland:
Poręby, Lower Silesian Voivodeship (south-west Poland)
Poręby, Lublin Voivodeship (east Poland)
Poręby, Podlaskie Voivodeship (north-east Poland)
Poręby, Gmina Bełchatów in Łódź Voivodeship (central Poland)
Poręby, Opoczno County in Łódź Voivodeship (central Poland)
Poręby, Wieluń County in Łódź Voivodeship (central Poland)
Poręby, Zduńska Wola County in Łódź Voivodeship (central Poland)
Poręby, Subcarpathian Voivodeship (south-east Poland)
Poręby, Sanok County in Subcarpathian Voivodeship (south-east Poland)
Poręby, Garwolin County in Masovian Voivodeship (east-central Poland)
Poręby, Mińsk County in Masovian Voivodeship (east-central Poland)
Poręby, Otwock County in Masovian Voivodeship (east-central Poland)
Poręby, Greater Poland Voivodeship (west-central Poland)
Poręby, Pomeranian Voivodeship (north Poland)
Poręby, Warmian-Masurian Voivodeship (north Poland)